Heritage House may refer to;

Sheffield Royal Infirmary, a former hospital in Sheffield, South Yorkshire, England.
Heritage House (brewery), once part of the Iron City Brewing Company in Pittsburgh, Pennsylvania, United States.
The Heritage House, a non-profit kiruv organization in Jerusalem.
Heritage House, a Canadian publisher
Heritage House, a former hotel in Marquette, Michigan, United States, now known as the Landmark Inn

Museums
Heritage House (Compton, California), California Historical Landmark #664.
Heritage House (Irving, Texas), an historic home operated by the Irving Heritage Society
Heritage House (Riverside, California), an historic home operated by the Museum of Riverside in Riverside, California, United States.
Heritage House (Smiths Falls, Ontario), a museum in Ontario, Canada.
Key West Heritage House Museum and Robert Frost Cottage, a museum in Key West, Florida, United States.